The National Police Commission is the policy making and oversight body of the National Police Agency of South Korea. It is headquartered in Seoul.  It was established on July 31, 1991, as part of a general reorganization of the national police force.

See also
Government of South Korea
List of South Korean government agencies
List of law enforcement agencies
Public safety

References

External links
Official site

Law enforcement agencies of South Korea
Korea, South